Nader Altayeb is a Sudanese footballer who plays for the Sudanese club Al-Ahli Shendi in the Sudan Premier League. He plays as a striker. He was brought from Al Hilal in December 2011 on a free transfer. He was scored for Al Ahli Shendi in the 2012 CAF Confederation Cup against the Mozambican team Ferroviário de Maputo.

International goals

References

Sudanese footballers
Association football forwards
Living people
Al-Hilal Club (Omdurman) players
Al-Ahly Shendi players
1992 births
Sudan international footballers
Alamal SC Atbara players